B. Tennyson Sebastian II is an American sound engineer. He was nominated for an Academy Award in the category Best Sound for the film Back to the Future. He has worked on more than 40 films since 1980.

Selected filmography
 Back to the Future (1985)

References

External links

Year of birth missing (living people)
Living people
American audio engineers